The Love EP is the fourth extended play (EP) by English singer-songwriter Corinne Bailey Rae. It was released on 25 January 2011 by Capitol Records. The EP consists of five cover versions of love songs. Bailey Rae has described The Love EP as "an homage to some of my favourite musicians and a conversation between some of my musical influences". The first single, a cover of Bob Marley and the Wailers' "Is This Love", won the Grammy Award for Best R&B Performance at the 54th Grammy Awards.

Critical reception

The Love EP received generally positive reviews from music critics. At Metacritic, which assigns a normalised rating out of 100 to reviews from mainstream publications, the album received an average score of 69, based on six reviews. Andy Kellman of AllMusic viewed the EP as "a light stop-gap to hold fans over until Rae's third album", adding that "it's all the more enjoyable to hear the singer indulge herself and have a little fun with a set of favorites." Zach Gase of Okayplayer commended Bailey Rae for her versatility and wrote that "[t]here really isn't a weak moment on The Love EP." Greg Kot of Entertainment Weekly noted that Bailey Rae sounds "spunkier" than usual on the EP, citing her rendition of "Que Sera Sera" as a highlight.

Frank Mojica of Consequence of Sound stated, "While every cover on The Love may not be exceptional, Corinne Bailey Rae once again exhibits remarkable vocal and musical range." David Mine of PopMatters named "Que Sera Sera" the standout track of the EP, but felt that "[e]lsewhere, results are mixed", concluding, "If nothing else, Rae is to be commended for branching out and trying new styles, but it's that final song that really makes this record worthwhile."

Track listing

Personnel
Credits adapted from the liner notes of The Love EP.

 Corinne Bailey Rae – vocals ; percussion ; backing vocals ; production ; Marxophone ; arrangement ; glockenspiel ; electric guitar, premix 
 Bryan Adams – photography
 Gerard Albo – mixing, recording 
 Barny – mixing 
 Jennifer Birch – guitar ; backing vocals, electric guitar 
 Steve Brown – percussion ; engineering, production ; keyboards ; glockenspiel, Marxophone ; synths ; arrangement, organ, piano, programming, Wurlitzer ; backing vocals ; premix 
 Matt Colton – mastering
 Ruadhri Cushnan – mixing 
 Luke Flowers – drums 
 Kenny Higgins – bass ; Spanish guitar ; vocals 
 Gordon H. Jee – creative director
 Randall Leddy – design
 Nelson Lugo – mix assistance 
 John McCallum – guitar ; acoustic guitar, additional electric guitar ; backing vocals ; electric guitar ; additional vocal arrangement ; vocals 
 Joeri Saal – engineering 
 Ray Staff – mastering
 Phil Tan – mixing 
 Ghian Wright – mixing

Charts

Release history

References

2011 EPs
Capitol Records EPs
Corinne Bailey Rae albums
Covers EPs
Virgin Records EPs